Meneou is a village in the Larnaca District of Cyprus, located 3 km northeast of Kiti.

References

Dromolaxia–Meneou Municipality